The Sandown Stakes is a registered Melbourne Racing Club Group 3  Thoroughbred open quality handicap horse race over a distance of 1500 metres,  held at Sandown Racecourse, Melbourne, Australia in mid November. Prize money for the race is A$200,000.

History
In 2013 the race was run at Caulfield Racecourse due to Sandown Racecourse being under construction.

Name
 1981–1987 - G.J. Coles Stakes
 1988–1990 - Coles New World Stakes
 1991 - Coles Supermarkets Stakes
 1992–2007 - Sandown Stakes 
 2008–2009 - Race Tech Stakes
 2010 - Zaidee's Rainbow Foundation Stakes
 2011 - Alannah & Madeline Foundation Stakes
 2012–2015 - Sandown Stakes 
 2016 - Yarramalong Racing Club Stakes
 2017 - Chandler Macleod Recruitment Stakes

Grade
 1981–1983 - Listed race
 1984 onwards  - Group 3

Distance
 1981–2007 - 1400 metres
 2008–2012 - 1500 metres
 2013 - 1400 metres
 2014 onwards - 1500 metres

Winners

 2022 - Gentleman Roy 
 2021 - Elephant 
 2020 - Junipal
 2019 - Gold Fields
 2018 - Fifty Stars
 2017 - Dollar For Dollar
 2016 - Redkirk Warrior
 2015 - Charmed Harmony
 2014 - Pornichet		
 2013 - Mahisara
 2012 - Mahisara
 2011 - Under The Eiffel
 2010 - Larrys Never Late
 2009 - Nine Tales
 2008 - Chasm
 2007 - Gotta Have Heart
 2006 - Swick
 2005 - Titanic Jack
 2004 - Amtrak
 2003 - Chong Tong
 2002 - Salgado
 2001 - Little Dozer
 2000 - Normal Practice
 1999 - Buster Jones
 1998 - Any Rhythm
 1997 - Cut Up Rough
 1996 - Wavertree
 1995 - Mamzelle Pedrille
 1994 - Another Victor
 1993 - Monsieur
 1992 - Minyama
 1991 - Wrap Around
 1990 - Procol Harum
 1989 - Marabous Phantom
 1988 - Rendoo
 1987 - Luther's Luck
 1986 - New Atlantis
 1985 - Jurisdiction
 1984 - Mr Ironclad
 1983 - Vivacite
 1982 - Showmeran
 1981 - Tower Belle

See also
 List of Australian Group races
 Group races

References

Horse races in Australia